Ramon Margalef i López (Barcelona 16 May 1919 - 23 May 2004) was a Spanish biologist and ecologist. He was Emeritus Professor of Ecology at the Faculty of Biology of the University of Barcelona. Margalef, one of the most prominent scientists that Spain has produced, worked at the Institute of Applied Biology (1946–1951), and at the Fisheries Research Institute, which he directed during 1966-1967. He created the Department of Ecology of the University of Barcelona, from where he trained a huge number of ecologists, limnologists and oceanographers. In 1967 he became Spain's first professor of ecology.

Career summary 
In 1957, with the translation into English of his inaugural lecture as a member of the Barcelona Royal Academy of Arts and Sciences, "Information Theory in Ecology", he gained a worldwide audience. Another groundbreaking article, "On certain unifying principles in ecology", published in American Naturalist in 1963, and his book "Perspectives in Ecological Theory" (1968), based on his guest lectures at the University of Chicago, consolidated him as one of the leading thinkers of modern ecology. In the summer of 1958 he was professor of Marine ecology at the Institute of Marine Biology (currently Department of Marine Sciences) of the University of Puerto Rico at Mayagüez and produced the work  ("Natural Communities").

Some of his most important work includes the application of information theory to ecological studies and the creation of mathematical models for the study of populations. Among his books, the most influential are: Natural Communities (1962), Perspectives In Ecological Theory (1968), Ecology (1974), The Biosphere (1980), Limnology (1983) and Theory of Ecological Systems (1991). He received many scientific awards, including the inaugural medal of the A.G. Huntsman Award for Excellence in the Marine Sciences, the Naumann-Thienemann Medal from the International Society of Limnology (SIL), the Ramón y Cajal Award of the Spanish Government, and the Gold Medal of the Generalitat of Catalonia (Catalan Government). In 2004, the Government of Catalonia established the Ramon Margalef Prize in Ecology, whereas the Association for the Sciences of Limnology and Oceanography established the Ramón Margalef Award for Excellence in Education in 2008.

Selected publications
Full list of publications by Professor Margalef

Papers

Books

See also
Ramon Margalef Prize in Ecology

References

External links
Biographical page in memory of Ramon Margalef (most of Margalef's scientific papers as PDFs, pictures, awards, etc.)
Full list of publications by Professor Margalef
Biographical page at Ramon Margalef Prize website

Espai Margalef (University of Barcelona Library)Digital.CSIC. Fons digitalitzat de les publicacions de Ramon Margalef per la biblioteca de l'Institut de Ciencies del Mar de Barcelona.
Digital CSIC. Digitized collection of Ramon Margalef's publications by the library of the Institut de Ciences del Mar, Barcelona.

1919 births
2004 deaths
Mathematical ecologists
Systems ecologists
Spanish limnologists
Spanish oceanographers
Academic staff of the University of Barcelona
Spanish ecologists
Biologists from Catalonia
Foreign associates of the National Academy of Sciences